Comorian (Shikomori, or Shimasiwa, the "language of islands") is the name given to a group of four Bantu languages spoken in the Comoro Islands, an archipelago in the southwestern Indian Ocean between Mozambique and Madagascar. It is named as one of the official languages of the Union of the Comoros in the Comorian constitution. Shimaore, one of the languages, is spoken on the disputed island of Mayotte, a French department claimed by Comoros.

Like Swahili, the Comorian languages are Sabaki languages, part of the Bantu language family. Each island has its own language, and the four are conventionally divided into two groups: the eastern group is composed of Shindzuani (spoken on Ndzuani) and Shimaore (Mayotte), while the western group is composed of Shimwali (Mwali) and Shingazija (Ngazidja). Although the languages of different groups are not usually mutually intelligible, only sharing about 80% of their lexicon, there is mutual intelligibility between the languages within each group, suggesting that Shikomori should be considered as two language groups, each including two languages, rather than four distinct languages.

Historically, the language was written in the Arabic-based Ajami script. The French colonial administration introduced the Latin script, of which a modified version was officially decreed in 2009. Many Comorians now use the Latin script when writing the Comorian language although the Ajami script is still widely used, especially by women.

It is the language of Umodja wa Masiwa, the national anthem.

Phonology
The consonants and vowels in the Comorian languages:

Vowels

Consonants 

References

Works cited
 
  2 vols.

Further reading
Ahmed-Chamanga, Mohamed. (1997) Dictionnaire français-comorien (dialecte Shindzuani). Paris: L'Harmattan.
Djohar, Abdou. (2014) Approche contrastive franco-comorienne: les séquences figées à caractère adjectival. Université Paris-Nord.
Johansen, Aimee. A History of Comorian Linguistics. in John M. Mugane (ed.), Linguistic Typology and Representation of African Languages. Africa World Press. Trenton, New Jersey.
Rey, Veronique. (1994) Première approche du mwali. Africana Linguistica XI. Tervuren: MRAC.

External links
Shingazidja

Languages of the Comoros
Swahili language
Mahoran culture